The Andalucia Tennis Experience was a professional women's tennis tournament played on outdoor clay courts. The inaugural edition was in 2009. The event is affiliated with the Women's Tennis Association (WTA) and is an International tournament on the WTA Tour. The scheduled 2012 edition was cancelled.
In 2021, a one off men's edition took place to fill up the void in ATP Tour calendar left due to the withdrawal of certain tournaments as a result of uncertainties caused by Covid-19 pandemic.

Past finals

Men's singles

Women's singles

Men's doubles

Women's doubles

See also
 Marbella Tennis Open

References

 
WTA Tour
Clay court tennis tournaments
Defunct tennis tournaments in Spain
Recurring sporting events established in 2009
Recurring sporting events disestablished in 2013
Sport in Marbella